Christina Cole (born 8 May 1982) is an English actress known for portraying Cassie Hughes in the Sky One supernatural television series Hex.

Early life
Born in London, Cole is the eldest of three siblings. She has a younger sister, Cassandra, and a brother, Dominic. Her mother is a telecentre manager and her father is a driving instructor. Cole trained at the Oxford School of Drama, graduating in 2002.

Career
Cole won the role of Clarissa Payne in What a Girl Wants (2003), while still at drama school. She graduated early to begin filming. She was then cast as Juliet in a production of Romeo and Juliet at Clwyd Theatr Cymru.

Cole's first lead role was that of Cassie Hughes in Hex. She portrayed Cassie for the whole of the first season and the first three episodes of the second. Upon her departure, the character was killed off. Co-star Jemima Rooper has stated that the reason for Cole's exit from the series was that she wanted to move on.

After leaving Hex, Cole went on to appear as Blanche Ingram in the critically acclaimed BBC television serial Jane Eyre and guest starred as Lilith in the Doctor Who episode "The Shakespeare Code". She provided an audio commentary for the episode on the DVD release of the series' third series alongside David Tennant.

Other roles include a small part in the James Bond film Casino Royale (2006), as the receptionist at the Ocean Club Hotel in Nassau, Bahamas, and Diana Mann in the pilot episode of Cane, Cole's first appearance on American television. She has also appeared as Mel on the ITV sitcom Sold, as Jenny Walker in The Deaths of Ian Stone (2007), and as Charlotte Warren in Miss Pettigrew Lives for a Day (2008).

Cole once again played alongside Jemima Rooper as Caroline Bingley in Lost in Austen.

In 2009, Cole played Dr. Sarah King in Poirot: Appointment with Death. In 2009, Cole was cast in the lead role for a failed pilot prepared for Fox about a brilliant surgeon who endures adult-onset schizophrenia. That same year she also appeared in the films Surviving Evil and Doghouse.

In 2012, Cole appeared in a music video for Cheyenne Jackson's "Before You".

Since 2015, Cole has portrayed Dr. Paula Agard on a recurring basis in the USA Network series Suits, and appeared in an episode of the NBC series The Blacklist. The same year she also portrayed Mrs Sprot in the BBC's Partners in Crime series, in two episodes adapting Agatha Christie's N or M?.

In 2016, Cole opened at the Playhouse Theatre as Stevie in the world premiere of Matthew Perry's play The End of Longing.

Filmography

Film

Television

Video Games

Theatre
 Romeo and Juliet, Theatr Clwyd, October 2002 to November 2002 (playing Juliet)
 The Tempest, Pegasus Theatre, February 2003 (role unknown)
 The Lightning Play, Almeida Theatre, November 2006 to January 2007 (playing Tabby Morris)
 The Magistrate, National Theatre, 14 November 2012 to 10 February 2013 (playing Charlotte). Streamed live to cinemas across the UK.
 The End of Longing, Playhouse Theatre, February 2016 to May 2016 (playing Stevie)

References

External links

 
 Christina Cole – The Placeholder Page

1982 births
Living people
English film actresses
English stage actresses
English television actresses
Alumni of the Oxford School of Drama
Actresses from London
English Shakespearean actresses
21st-century English actresses